William Goldwyn Nunn III (October 20, 1953 – September 24, 2016) was an American actor known for his roles as Radio Raheem in Spike Lee's film Do the Right Thing, Robbie Robertson in the Sam Raimi Spider-Man film trilogy and as Terrence "Pip" Phillips on The Job (2001–02).

Early life
Bill Nunn III was born in Pittsburgh, Pennsylvania, the son of Frances Nunn and William G. Nunn, Jr., a journalist and editor at the Pittsburgh Courier and a National Football League scout. His paternal grandfather was the first African American football player at George Westinghouse High School. While ball boys for the Pittsburgh Steelers, Bill Nunn and current Steelers president Art Rooney II stole "Mean" Joe Greene's car during training camp at Saint Vincent College in Latrobe, Pennsylvania. "Joe Greene showed up in a beautiful green Lincoln Continental, and me and Bill Nunn, Jr. were ball boys. Somehow Bill got the keys one night and we decided to take it for a ride. We only told Joe that story about 10 years ago. We figured that enough time had passed that we could disclose our little joy ride."

Nunn was a 1970 graduate of Schenley High School and a 1976 graduate of Morehouse College. He attended college with Spike Lee and appeared in several of Lee's early feature films.

Career
Nunn made his credited film debut in the 1988 Spike Lee film School Daze, and is best known for his roles as Radio Raheem in Lee's Do the Right Thing, and as Nino Brown's bodyguard Duh Duh Duh Man in New Jack City. Some of his other film credits include Lee's Mo' Better Blues and He Got Game, as well as Regarding Henry, Sister Act, Canadian Bacon, The Last Seduction, Things To Do In Denver When You're Dead, Runaway Jury, Spider-Man trilogy (as Joseph "Robbie" Robertson), Firehouse Dog, the television series The Job, Randy and The Mob, and the 2016 televised adaptation of A Raisin in the Sun.

Nunn also performed on stage, including August Wilson's Fences, a Pittsburgh-based play in which Nunn performed with Anthony Mackie, who played Nunn's character's son. He was also very involved in community outreach, and he formed his own Pittsburgh-area outreach project in 2008.

Death 
Nunn died on September 24, 2016, at his home in Pittsburgh's Hill District; he was 62 years old. His widow, Donna, confirmed that he had leukemia.

Filmography
 1981 Sharky's Machine as Kitten's Bouncer (uncredited)
 1988 School Daze as Grady
 1989 Do the Right Thing as Radio Raheem
 1989 A Connecticut Yankee in King Arthur's Court as School Teacher
 1989 Glory (uncredited)
 1990 Def by Temptation as Dougy
 1990 Cadillac Man as Grave Digger
 1990 Mo' Better Blues as Bottom Hammer (Bass)
 1991 New Jack City as "Duh Duh Man"
 1991 Regarding Henry as Bradley, Physical Therapist
 1991 White Lie as Chief Adams
 1992 Sister Act as Lieutenant Eddie Souther
 1993 Loaded Weapon 1 as Police Photographer
 1993 Blood Brothers as William Crawford
 1994 The Last Seduction as Harlan
 1994 Save Me as Detective Vincent
 1995 Candyman: Farewell to the Flesh as Reverend Ellis
 1995 Canadian Bacon as Kabral
 1995 Things to Do in Denver When You're Dead as "Easy Wind"
 1995 True Crime as Detective Jerry Guinn
 1995 The Affair (TV Movie) as Sergeant Rivers
 1995 Money Train as Crash Train Motorman
 1995 New York Undercover (TV Series) as Lieutenant Carver
 1996 Touched by an Angel (TV Series) as Frank Champness
 1996 Bulletproof as DEA Agent Finch
 1996 Extreme Measures as Detective Bob Burke
 1997 Quicksilver Highway as Len
 1997 Kiss the Girls as Detective John Sampson
 1997 Mad City as Cliff Williams (uncredited)
 1997 Ellen Foster as Mr. Douglas
 1998 Always Outnumbered as Howard M'Shalla
 1998 He Got Game as Uncle Bubba
 1998 Ambushed as Watts Fatboy
 1999 The Legend of 1900 as Danny Boodman
 1999 The Tic Code as Kingston
 1999 Passing Glory as Howard Porter
 1999 Foolish as Jimmy Beck
 1999 The Hungry Bachelors Club as Moses Grady
 2000 Lockdown as Charles
 2001-2002 The Job (TV Series) as Terrence "Pip" Phillips
 2001 The Substitute 4: Failure Is Not An Option as Luther
 2002 Spider-Man as Joe "Robbie" Robertson
 2002 People I Know as Reverend Lyle Blunt
 2003 Runaway Jury as Lonnie Shaver
 2004 Spider-Man 2 as Joe "Robbie" Robertson
 2006 Out There<ref></ref> as Desmond
 2006 Idlewild as G.W.
 2007 Firehouse Dog as Joe Musto
 2007 Spider-Man 3 as Joe "Robbie" Robertson
 2007 Randy and the Mob as Wardlowe Gone
 2008 A Raisin in the Sun as "Bobo"
 2008 Little Bear and the Master as The Warden
 2009 Fences 
 2009 Help Me, Help You as Detective
 2012 Won't Back Down as Principal Holland 
 2014–2015 Sirens'' (TV series) as "Cash" (final appearance)

References

External links

Obituary  at cremationfuneralcare.com
Life of Bill Nunn from death-notices.co.uk (archived)

1953 births
2016 deaths
African-American male actors
American male film actors
American male television actors
Deaths from cancer in Pennsylvania
Deaths from leukemia
Male actors from Pittsburgh
Morehouse College alumni
Schenley High School alumni
20th-century African-American people
21st-century African-American people